Athrypsiastis candidella is a moth in the family Xyloryctidae. It was described by Francis Walker in 1863. It is found on Borneo. Adults are silvery white, without any markings.

References

Athrypsiastis
Moths described in 1863
Moths of Asia